Roberto Navarro Gonzalez (born April 14, 1988) is a boxer from the Dominican Republic.  He completed in the 2008 Summer Olympics in the featherweight division.  He lost via tiebreaker (after a 3-3 tie) in the first round to Luis Enrique Porozo of Ecuador.

References
Roberto Navarro's profile at ESPN Sports

1988 births
Living people
Olympic boxers of the Dominican Republic
Boxers at the 2008 Summer Olympics
Dominican Republic male boxers
Featherweight boxers